Pedro is a masculine given name. Pedro is the Spanish, Portuguese, and Galician name for Peter. Its French equivalent is Pierre while its English and Germanic form is Peter.

The counterpart patronymic surname of the name Pedro, meaning "son of Peter" (compare with the English surname Peterson) is Pérez in Spanish, and Peres in Galician and Portuguese, Pires also in Portuguese, and Peiris in coastal area of Sri Lanka (where it originated from the Portuguese version), with all ultimately meaning "son of Pêro".

The name Pedro is derived via the Latin word "petra", from the Greek word "η πέτρα" meaning "stone, rock".

The name Peter itself is a translation of the Aramaic Kephas or Cephas meaning "stone".

An alternate archaic spelling is Pêro.

Pedro may refer to:

Notable people

Monarchs, mononymously
Pedro I of Portugal
Pedro II of Portugal
Pedro III of Portugal
Pedro IV of Portugal, also Pedro I of Brazil
Pedro V of Portugal
Pedro II of Brazil
Pedro of Castile
Peter I of Aragon and Navarre, also known as Pedro I
Peter II of Aragon
Peter III of Aragon
Peter IV of Aragon
Peter V of Aragon, also Pedro IV of Barcelona

In sports, mononymously
Pedro (footballer, born 1978), Pedro Hernández Martínez, Spanish football player, right-back
Pedro (footballer, born 1984), Pedro Santa Cecilia García, Spanish football player, midfielder
Pedro (footballer, born 1986), Pedro Antonio Sánchez Moñino, Spanish footballer, forward
Pedro (footballer, born 1987), Pedro Eliezer Rodríguez Ledesma, Spanish footballer, forward/winger
Pedro (footballer, born 1997), Pedro Guilherme Abreu dos Santos, Brazilian football player, forward
Pedro (footballer, born 1999), Pedro Augusto Cabral Carvalho, Brazilian football player, forward
Pedro (footballer, born 2006), Pedro Henrique Silva dos Santos, Brazilian football player, forward

In sports
Pedró, José Pedro Azevedo Ferreira, Portuguese football player
Pedro Acosta, 2021 Moto3 World Champion
Pedro Acosta, Venezuelan football player
Pedro Aroche, Mexican race walker
Pedro Casado (1937–2021), Spanish footballer
Pedro Chirivella, Spanish football player
Pedro Collins, West Indian cricketer
Pedro de la Rosa, Spanish racing driver
Pedro Diniz, Brazilian racing driver
Pedro Gil, Spanish Roller hockey player
Pedro Gusmão, Brazilian football player
Pedro Iznaga, Cuban volleyball player
Pedro Jirón, Nicaraguan footballer
Pedro Lamy, Portuguese Grand Prix driver
Pedro Lima (swimmer) (born 1971), former Olympic swimmer from Angola
Pedro Lima (boxer) (born 1983), Brazilian boxer
Pedro Martínez, American baseball player
Pedro Miguel Pauleta, Portuguese football player
Pedro Morales, Puerto Rican professional wrestler
Pedro Pérez, Cuban triple jumper
Pedro Pineda, Mexican football player
Pedro Rodríguez (disambiguation), multiple people
Pedro Senatore Ramos, Ecuadorian football referee
Pedro da Silva (decathlete), Brazilian decathlete
Pedro Botelho (footballer, born 1989), Brazilian footballer
Pedro Zabála, Bolivian footballer

Politicians and leaders
Pedro, Marshal of Navarre, 15th- and 16th-century nobleman
Pedro Aguirre Cerda, Chilean political figure
Pedro Atacho, Curaçaoan politician
Pedro Eugenio Aramburu, President of Argentina from 1955 to 1958
Pedro Lascuráin, President of Mexico
Pedro Nel Ospina Vázquez, Colombian general and political figure
Pedro Pablo Ramírez, President of Argentina from 1943 to 1944
Pedro Rosselló, Governor of Puerto Rico from 1993 to 2001
Pedro I. "Pete" Saenz, American politician
José Pedro Pérez-Llorca, Spanish politician
Pedro Sánchez, Prime Minister of Spain since 2018
Pedro Pablo Kuczynski, President of Peru from 2016 to 2018

Explorers
Pedro Álvares Cabral, Portuguese navigator and explorer
Pedro Escobar, Portuguese explorer who discovered São Tomé and Príncipe
Pedro Teixeira, Portuguese explorer

Criminals
Pedro Castillo, one of two murderers of a 4 year-old girl
Pedro Costa de Oliveira, Brazilian serial killer
Pedro Padilla Flores, Mexican serial killer
Pedro Hernandez, convicted in the Disappearance of Etan Patz
Pedro López (serial killer), Colombian serial killer
Pedro Medina, Cuban murderer
Pedro Pablo Nakada Ludeña, Peruvian serial killer
Pedro Rodrigues Filho, Brazilian serial killer
Pedro Rosa da Conceição, Brazilian mass murderer

Other
Pedro Almodóvar, Spanish filmmaker
Pedro de Ayala, Spanish diplomat
Pedro Calungsod, Filipino saint
Pedro de San José de Betancur, Spanish saint and missionary in Guatemala.
Pedro Alcantara de Souza (died 2010), Brazilian land reform activist
Pedro Dimas, Mexican musician
Pedro Duro, Spanish businessman
Pedro Gomez (dance instructor), Cuban Salsa dance instructor
Pedro Gomez (journalist), American television reporter
Pedro X. Molina (born 1976), Nicaraguan caricaturist 
Pedro Nunes, Portuguese mathematician
Pedro Páez, Spanish Jesuit missionary in Ethiopia
Pedro Pascal, Chilean-American actor
Perucho Figueredo, Cuban poet
Pedro Reyes (comedian), Spanish comedian 
Pedro Rodriguez (scientist), Puerto Rican scientist and inventor
Pedro Sousa, Portuguese comedian
Pedro Rodríguez (soldier), Puerto Rican Korean War hero
Pedro Trebbau, German-born, Venezuelan zoologist
Pedro Yap, former Philippine Chief Justice
Pedro Zamora, cast member on The Real World
Pêro Vaz de Caminha, Portuguese knight

Fictional characters 
 Pedro, from The Power of Five novel series by Anthony Horowitz
 Pedro, a character from the One Piece manga series
 Pedro, a character from the Excel Saga manga series
 Don Pedro, a character from Much Ado About Nothing, a comedy by William Shakespeare
 Don Pedro, a character from the Philippine story Ibong Adarna
 Pedro the Mail Burro, a mascot of the Boy Scouting magazine Boys' Life
 Pedro Sanchez, character from the film Napoleon Dynamite
 Pedro, another name of Panama Joe, a character from Montezuma's Revenge (video game)
 Pedro, in the Sam & Max Season Two video game series
 Pedro, a mascot of South of the Border roadside attraction
 Pedro, a Red-crested Cardinal from Rio 
 Pedro Penduko, a Filipino comic book character
 Pedro Plane, protagonist in the Saludos Amigos segment Pedro
 Pedro Pony, a character from the animated TV series Peppa Pig
 Both the name of the gardener and the game itself released in 1984 by Imagine Software

See also
Pedro (disambiguation)
Pérez

References

Spanish masculine given names
Portuguese masculine given names